Qeshlaq-e Gurchinlu Hajj Najaf (also Romanized as Qeshlāq-e Gūrčīnlū Ḩājj Najaf) is a village in Qeshlaq-e Jonubi Rural District, Qeshlaq Dasht District, Bileh Savar County, Ardabil Province, Iran. At the 2006 census, its population was 153, in 31 families.

References 

Towns and villages in Bileh Savar County